How to Survive a Plague is a 2012 American documentary film about the early years of the AIDS epidemic, and the efforts of activist groups ACT UP and TAG. It was directed by David France, a journalist who covered AIDS from its beginnings. France's first film, it was dedicated to his partner Doug Gould who died of AIDS-related pneumonia in 1992. The documentary was produced using more than 700 hours of archived footage which included news coverage, interviews as well as film of demonstrations, meetings and conferences taken by ACT UP members themselves. France says they knew what they were doing was historic, and that many of them would die. The film, which opened in select theatres across the United States on September 21, 2012, also includes footage of a demonstration during mass at St. Patrick's Cathedral in 1989.

Subjects
People featured in the film include:

 Bill Bahlman
 David Barr
 Gregg Bordowitz
 George H. W. Bush (archive footage)
 Bill Clinton (archive footage)
 Spencer Cox
 Jim Eigo
 Susan Ellenberg
 Anthony Fauci
 Mark Harrington
 Jesse Helms (archive footage)
 Garance Franke-Ruta
 Larry Kramer
 Mathilde Krim
 Ed Koch
 Iris Long
 Ray Navarro
 Ann Northrop
 Bob Rafsky
 Peter Staley

Summary
Beginning at the start of the HIV/AIDS epidemic in New York City, the documentary follows a group of AIDS activists and founders of the AIDS group ACT UP, and follows their struggle for response from the United States government and medical establishment in developing effective HIV/AIDS medications. Activists took it upon themselves to convince the FDA to approve drugs which could slow or even halt the HIV virus, and demanded that drug trials (which would usually take 7–10 years) be shortened so potentially life-saving treatments could be made available. The film also documents the underground market for HIV drugs: many people relied on drugs imported from other countries, which were believed to potentially slow down the HIV virus despite not being FDA-approved.

At the time, the only drug available to slow the progression of HIV was AZT, which in many cases was toxic to HIV-infected people, and in some cases even caused blindness. The cost of AZT was about $10,000 per year in the late 1980s. ACT UP's efforts led to the creation of the International AIDS Conference. Eventually, DDI, an alternative to AZT that did not cause blindness, was released by the FDA despite not going through a full-length safety trial.

HIV activists also protested the immigration policies banning HIV-positive people from immigrating to the United States as being discriminatory and homophobic.

When existing drugs proved ineffective as treatment for HIV, TAG lobbied for more research into the HIV virus. In 1996, protease inhibitors were released. These consist of a combination of drugs which lower the HIV viral load in patients more than any drug had before. It was considered a breakthrough in HIV and AIDS research and continues to be used as a treatment for HIV and AIDS.

The documentary included interviews with HIV activists, physicians and members of underground organizations as well as clips of the protests, meetings and news coverage taking place during the 1980s and 1990s.

France's book of the same title, expanding on the material, events, and people covered in the film, was published in 2016 to critical acclaim.  It was described as "the definitive book on AIDS activism", was long-listed for the Andrew Carnegie Medal for Excellence and was named to numerous best-of and top-ten lists, including the New York Times 100 Notable Books for 2016.

Reception

Critical response
Currently, the film has a rating of 98% on Rotten Tomatoes, and an average score of 8.40/10, based on 80 reviews. The website's critical consensus states, "Angry, powerful, and stirring, How to Survive a Plague is a brilliantly constructed documentary about the activists who pushed for action to combat the AIDS epidemic". It also has a score of 86 out of 100 on Metacritic, based on 23 critics, indicating "universal acclaim".

AIDS historian Sarah Schulman has criticized the film for its focus on wealthy, white activists over the "different kinds of people from every class and background" involved in ACT UP.

Accolades
How to Survive a Plague received awards for best documentary of 2012 from the Gotham Independent Film Awards, GALECA: The Society of LGBTQ Entertainment Critics, and from the Boston Society of Film Critics. The Independent Spirit Awards nominated it for Best Documentary. It was nominated for the Academy Award for Best Documentary Feature at the 85th Academy Awards. The film also won a GLAAD Media Award for Outstanding Documentary and a Peabody Award. It was nominated for a Directors Guild Award and the Grand Jury Prize at the Sundance Film Festival. Critic A. O. Scott of The New York Times named How to Survive a Plague one of the best five documentaries of 2012. Fellow New York Times critic Stephen Holden called the documentary the eighth best film of 2012. It also won Documentary of the Year at Attitude magazine's Attitude Awards 2013.

See also
 Grassroots Activism
 International Aids Society
 United in Anger: A History of ACT UP, a 2012 documentary

References

External links
 Official website
 
 
 

2012 films
2012 documentary films
Documentary films about American politics
Documentary films about HIV/AIDS
Films about Bill Clinton
2012 LGBT-related films
American documentary films
Films about activists
Films about viral outbreaks
2012 directorial debut films
2010s English-language films
HIV/AIDS in American films
American LGBT-related films
2010s American films